Boris Yevseyevich Chertok (– 14 December 2011) was a Russian electrical engineer and the control systems designer in the Soviet Union's space program, and later found employment in Roscosmos.

Major responsibility under his guidance was primarily based on computerized control system of the Russian missiles and rocketry system, and authored the four-volume book Rockets and People– the definitive source of information about the history of the Soviet space program.

From 1974, he was the deputy chief designer of the S.P. Korolev Rocket and Space Corporation Energia, the space aircraft designer bureau which he started working for in 1946. He retired in 1992.

Personal life

Born in Łódź (modern Poland), his family moved to Moscow when he was aged 3. Starting from 1930, he worked as an electrician in a metropolitan suburb. Since 1934, he was already designing military aircraft in Bolkhovitinov design bureau. In 1946, he entered the rocket-pioneering NII-88 as a head of control systems department, working along with Sergei Korolev, whose deputy he became after OKB-1 spun off from the NII-88 in 1956.

He was married to Yekaterina Semyonovna Golubkina. He was an atheist.

Rockets and People
Between 1994 and 1999 Boris Chertok, with support from his wife Yekaterina Golubkina, created the four-volume book series about the history of the Soviet space industry. The series was originally published in Russian, in 1999.

 Черток Б.Е. Ракеты и люди — М.: Машиностроение, 1999. (B. Chertok, Rockets and People) 
 Черток Б.Е. Ракеты и люди. Фили — Подлипки — Тюратам — М.: Машиностроение, 1999. (B. Chertok, Rockets and People. Fili — Podlipki — Tyuratam) 
 Черток Б.Е. Ракеты и люди. Горячие дни холодной войны — М.: Машиностроение, 1999. (B. Chertok, Rockets and People. Hot Days of the Cold War) 
 Черток Б.Е. Ракеты и люди. Лунная гонка — М.: Машиностроение, 1999. (B. Chertok, Rockets and People. The Moon Race)

Translation into English
NASA's History Division published four translated and somewhat edited volumes of the series between 2005 and 2011. The series editor was Asif Siddiqi, the author of Challenge to Apollo: The Soviet Union and the Space Race, 1945-1974. Chertok dedicated this series to his wife.
 
 Boris Chertok (author). Rockets and People, Volume 1, 2005. . Published by NASA.
 Boris Chertok (author). Rockets and People, Volume 2: Creating a Rocket Industry, 2006. . Published by NASA.
 Boris Chertok (author). Rockets and People, Volume 3: Hot Days of the Cold War, 2009. . Published by NASA.
 Boris Chertok (author). Rockets and People, Volume 4: The Moon Race, 2011.  Published by NASA.

Honours and awards
 Hero of Socialist Labour (1961)
 Order of Merit for the Fatherland, 4th class (1996)
 Two Orders of Lenin (1956, 1961)
 Order of the October Revolution (1971)
 Order of the Red Banner of Labour (1975)
 Order of the Red Star (1945)
 Medal "For Merit in Space Exploration" (12 April 2011) - for the great achievements in research, development and utilization of outer space, many years of diligent work, public activities
 Gold Medal BN Petrov Academy of Sciences (1992)
 Gold Medal named after SP Korolev, RAS (2008)
 Lenin Prize (1957) - for participation in creating the first artificial satellites
 USSR State Prize (1976) - for participation in the project "Soyuz-Apollo"
 International Prize of St Andrew "For Faith and Loyalty" (2010)
 Asteroid 6358 Chertok was named after him
 Corresponding Member of the USSR Academy of Sciences (1968) of the Department of Mechanics and Control Processes
 Member of the Russian Academy of Sciences (2000)
 Member of the International Academy of Astronautics (1990)
 Honorary Member of Russian Academy of Astronautics
 Member of the International Academy of Informatization
 Jubilee Medal "In Commemoration of the 100th Anniversary since the Birth of Vladimir Il'ich Lenin"
 Medal "For the Defence of Moscow"
 Medal "For the Victory over Germany in the Great Patriotic War 1941–1945"
 Jubilee Medal "Thirty Years of Victory in the Great Patriotic War 1941-1945"
 Jubilee Medal "Forty Years of Victory in the Great Patriotic War 1941-1945"
 Medal "For Valiant Labour in the Great Patriotic War 1941-1945"
 Jubilee Medal "60 Years of Victory in the Great Patriotic War 1941-1945"
 Medal "Veteran of Labour"
 Jubilee Medal "50 Years of the Armed Forces of the USSR"
 Jubilee Medal "60 Years of the Armed Forces of the USSR"
 Medal "In Commemoration of the 800th Anniversary of Moscow"
 Medal "In Commemoration of the 850th Anniversary of Moscow"
 Medal "In Commemoration of the 1500th Anniversary of Kiev"
 Jubilee Medal "300 Years of the Russian Navy"

See also
 Institute Rabe

References

Literature 
Vadimir Branets, Boris Evseyevich Chertok (to 95th birthday) ;
 "Testing of rocket and space technology - the business of my life" Events and facts - A.I. Ostashev, Korolyov, 2001.;
 A.I. Ostashev, Sergey Pavlovich Korolyov - The Genius of the 20th Century — 2010 M. of Public Educational Institution of Higher Professional Training MGUL ;
 «A breakthrough in space» - Konstantin Vasilyevich Gerchik, M: LLC "Veles", 1994, - ;
 "Look back and look ahead. Notes of a military engineer" - Rjazhsky A. A., 2004, SC. first, the publishing house of the "Heroes of the Fatherland" ;
 "Rocket and space feat Baikonur" - Vladimir Порошков, the "Patriot" publishers 2007. ;
 "Unknown Baikonur" - edited by B. I. Posysaeva, M.: "globe", 2001. ;
 "People duty and honor" – A. A. Shmelev, the second book. M: Editorial Board "Moscow journal", 1998.
 "Bank of the Universe" - edited by Boltenko A. C., Kyiv, 2014., publishing house "Phoenix", 
 "S. P. Korolev. Encyclopedia of life and creativity" - edited by C. A. Lopota, RSC Energia. S. P. Korolev, 2014 
 "Space science city Korolev" - Author: Posamentir R. D. M: publisher SP Struchenevsky O. V., 
 "History in faces and destiniesv" – Author: Posamentir R. D. M: publisher SP Struchenevsky O. V., 
 "I look back and have no regrets. " - Author: Abramov, Anatoly Petrovich: publisher "New format" Barnaul, 2022.

External links
 Rockets and People in English, published by NASA History
 Boris Chertok. Rockets and People, 2005. . NASA.
 Boris Chertok. Rockets and People, Volume 2: Creating a Rocket Industry, 2006. . NASA.
 Boris Chertok. Rockets and People, Volume 3: Hot Days of the Cold War, 2009. . NASA.
 Boris Chertok. Rockets and People, Volume 4: The Moon Race, 2011. NASA.
 Boris Chertok at Astronautix.com
 Rockets and People 
 Boris Chertok family history

1912 births
2011 deaths
Russian atheists
Control theorists
Russian electrical engineers
Russian aerospace engineers
Soviet engineers
20th-century Russian engineers
Early spaceflight scientists
Academic staff of the Moscow Institute of Physics and Technology
Heroes of Socialist Labour
Recipients of the Order of Lenin
Recipients of the Medal "For Merit in Space Exploration"
Lenin Prize winners
Recipients of the USSR State Prize
Corresponding Members of the USSR Academy of Sciences
Full Members of the Russian Academy of Sciences
Russian inventors
Rocket scientists
Soviet space program personnel
Soviet spaceflight pioneers
Employees of RSC Energia